Games of the XXI Olympiad is a Canadian documentary film, directed by Jean Beaudin, Marcel Carrière, Georges Dufaux and Jean-Claude Labrecque and released in 1977. The film compiles highlights of the 1976 Summer Olympics in Montreal, Quebec.

The film's 168-member crew shot 100 kilometres of film. The film had a budget of $1.37 million with $470,000 coming from the NFB.

The film premiered at the National Film Board theatre in Montreal on April 21, 1977, before receiving a television broadcast on May 29 on both CBC Television in English and Télévision de Radio-Canada in French.

The film received a Canadian Film Award nomination for Best Feature Length Documentary at the 28th Canadian Film Awards in 1977.

References

Works cited

External links
 

1977 films
1977 documentary films
Canadian sports documentary films
National Film Board of Canada documentaries
Documentary films about the Olympics
French-language Canadian films
Films directed by Jean Beaudin
Films directed by Marcel Carrière
Films directed by Jean-Claude Labrecque
1970s Canadian films